The 2018–19 1. FSV Mainz 05 season was the 114th season in the football club's history and tenth consecutive and thirteenth overall season in the top flight of German football, the Bundesliga, having been promoted from the 2. Bundesliga in 2009. In addition to the domestic league, Mainz 05 also participated in this season's edition of the domestic cup, the DFB-Pokal. This was the eighth season for Mainz in the Opel Arena, located in Mainz, Rhineland-Palatinate, Germany. The season covered a period from 1 July 2018 to 30 June 2019.

Players

Squad information

Friendly matches

Competitions

Overview

Bundesliga

League table

Results summary

Results by round

Matches

DFB-Pokal

Statistics

Appearances and goals

|-
! colspan=14 style=background:#dcdcdc; text-align:center| Goalkeepers

|-
! colspan=14 style=background:#dcdcdc; text-align:center| Defenders

|-
! colspan=14 style=background:#dcdcdc; text-align:center| Midfielders

|-
! colspan=14 style=background:#dcdcdc; text-align:center| Forwards

|-
! colspan=14 style=background:#dcdcdc; text-align:center| Players transferred out during the season

References

1. FSV Mainz 05 seasons
Mainz